Alejandro Fernández (born 2 April 1959) is a Mexican sports shooter. He competed in the men's trap event at the 1996 Summer Olympics.

References

1959 births
Living people
Mexican male sport shooters
Olympic shooters of Mexico
Shooters at the 1996 Summer Olympics
People from Xalapa
20th-century Mexican people